Grassjapyx is a genus of diplurans in the family Parajapygidae.

Species
 Grassjapyx afra (Silvestri, 1913)
 Grassjapyx ambiguus (Pagés, 1952)
 Grassjapyx bahianus (Silvestri, 1948)
 Grassjapyx birket-smithi (Pagés, 1958)
 Grassjapyx bolivarianus (Silvestri, 1929)
 Grassjapyx brasilianus (Silvestri, 1948)
 Grassjapyx chichinii (Pagés, 1953)
 Grassjapyx coiffaiti (Pagés, 1955)
 Grassjapyx dahli (Pagés, 1958)
 Grassjapyx dentata (Delamare-Deboutteville, 1947)
 Grassjapyx dissimilis (Pagés, 1953)
 Grassjapyx dundoanus (Pagés, 1952)
 Grassjapyx grandianus (Silvestri, 1929)
 Grassjapyx grassianus (Silvestri, 1911)
 Grassjapyx hwashanensis (Chou, 1966)
 Grassjapyx indica (Silvestri, 1913)
 Grassjapyx jinghongensis (Xie & Yang, 1990)
 Grassjapyx luachimoanus (Pagés, 1952)
 Grassjapyx mexicanus (Silvestri, 1948)
 Grassjapyx priesneri (Pagés, 1953)
 Grassjapyx queenslandica (Womersley, 1945)
 Grassjapyx reniformis (Pagés, 1998)
 Grassjapyx russianus (Silvestri, 1948)
 Grassjapyx sabahnus (Pagés, 1987)
 Grassjapyx samoanus (Silvestri, 1930)
 Grassjapyx scalpellus (Fox, 1941)
 Grassjapyx sensillatus (Pagés, 1954)
 Grassjapyx sepilok (Pagés, 1987)
 Grassjapyx temburong (Pagés, 1998)
 Grassjapyx vinciguerranus (Silvestri, 1929)
 Grassjapyx yangi (Chou, 1966)

References

Diplura